Forbidden Gardens was an outdoor museum of Chinese culture and history located on Texas Highway 99 and Franz Road in northern Katy, Greater Houston, Texas, United States. The museum was funded and opened by businessman Ira Poon in 1996. Forbidden Gardens closed its doors in 2011.

Features and naming
Forbidden Gardens took its name from two of its major features: A 1:20 scale model of the Forbidden City with hundreds of palace buildings and figurines under a  pavilion, and the small grounds for walking and viewing additional exhibits.

Additional exhibits included a detailed panorama of a scholarly retreat called Lodge of the Calming of the Heart, an outdoor array of 6,000 one-third scale soldiers and chariots from the Terracotta Army tomb of the first Emperor of Qin, an indoor panorama of a city called the Venice of China (Suzhou), and rooms exhibiting details of historical architecture and weapons.

Forbidden Gardens was unusual in that it was privately funded. It displayed extensive models made and shipped from China. It originally cost $40 million to construct and only 40 of the  Poon bought were used.  The Terracotta Army display was unique in that the statues were exposed to direct sunlight, unlike the sheltered originals, enabling excellent photography conditions.

Closure
It was announced that the Forbidden Gardens would close its doors on February 21, 2011, to make way for the Grand Parkway expansion. Terracotta soldiers were offered on Craigslist for $100 a soldier, sparking media attention. The warriors were pulled off Craigslist on February 9, with a note explaining that excess demand made it necessary.

External links
Forbidden Gardens website
Review of visiting the Forbidden Gardens in 2009
1995 news article when it opened, and reference to publicity-shy owner
The Grand Parkway Association
Snyder, Mike. "Katy attraction succumbs to Grand Parkway." Houston Chronicle. January 19, 2011.

References

Chinese-American culture in Texas
Gardens in Texas
Katy, Texas
Miniature parks
Museums in Harris County, Texas
Ethnic museums in Texas
Chinese-American museums
Defunct museums in Texas
1996 establishments in Texas
2011 disestablishments in Texas